Thomas William Roe (8 December 1900 – 1972) was an English professional footballer who played for Esperley Rovers, Willington Athletic, Durham City, Northfleet United, Tottenham Hotspur, Nottingham Forest, Luton Town, Walsall and Coventry City.

Football career 
Roe began his football career with Esperley Rovers and later played for Willington Athletic. In 1922 he joined Durham City where the forward scored eight goals in 17 appearances. Roe joined the Tottenham Hotspur "nursery" club Northfleet United  before signing with the Spurs in 1925. He featured in seven matches and found the back of the net four times for the North London club. After leaving White Hart Lane Roe had spells at Nottingham Forest, Luton Town, Walsall and finally Coventry City.

References 

1900 births
1972 deaths
Footballers from County Durham
Association football forwards
English footballers
Willington A.F.C. players
Durham City A.F.C. players
Northfleet United F.C. players
Tottenham Hotspur F.C. players
Nottingham Forest F.C. players
Luton Town F.C. players
Walsall F.C. players
Coventry City F.C. players
English Football League players